
Charles Lester Kinsolving, known as Les Kinsolving (December 18, 1927 – December 4, 2018), was an American political talk radio host, previously heard on WCBM in Baltimore, Maryland. He is known for being the first White House correspondent to ask questions about the HIV/AIDS epidemic during the Reagan administration; he continued to ask questions about the disease even though press secretary Larry Speakes and some other correspondents made light of it; Speakes joked that Kinsolving had an "abiding interest in the disease" because he was "a ". Kinsolving first asked questions about AIDS in 1982; President Reagan would not acknowledge the epidemic until 1985, by which time more than five thousand people had died from the disease.

Kinsolving was an outspoken opponent of gay rights organizations – "the sodomy lobby," as he referred to them – mainly because of his religious beliefs.

Kinsolving had a minor role as Confederate General William Barksdale in a couple of films: Gettysburg and Gods and Generals.

Kinsolving died on December 4, 2018.

Filmography

Further reading

References

External links
 

1927 births
2018 deaths
American male journalists
American radio personalities
American reporters and correspondents
American television talk show hosts
Episcopal High School (Alexandria, Virginia) alumni
San Francisco Examiner people
Journalists from New York City
20th-century American journalists